The Journal of Controlled Release is a biweekly peer-reviewed medical journal and the official journal of the Controlled Release Society. The journal covers research on the controlled release and delivery of drugs and other biologically active agents. Announcements and reports of future meetings pertaining to the activities of the Controlled Release Society are also included.

According to the Journal Citation Reports, the journal has a 2021 impact factor of 11.467, ranking it 10th out of 275 in the category Pharmacology & Pharmacy.

Abstracting and indexing 
The journal is abstracted and indexed in BIOSIS Previews, CAB Abstracts, Chemical Abstracts, Current Contents/Life Sciences, International Pharmaceutical Abstracts, EMBASE, MEDLINE, Polymer Contents, Science Citation Index, and Scopus.

References

External links 
 
 Controlled Release Society

Bimonthly journals
Elsevier academic journals
Pharmacology journals
Biweekly journals
English-language journals
Publications established in 1984